Whatcom County is a county located in the northwestern corner of the U.S. state of Washington, bordered by the Lower Mainland (the Metro Vancouver and Fraser Valley Regional Districts) of British Columbia to the north, Okanogan County to the east, Skagit County to the south, San Juan County across Rosario Strait to the southwest, and the Strait of Georgia to the west.  Its county seat and largest population center is the coastal city of Bellingham, comprising the Bellingham, WA Metropolitan Statistical Area, and as of the 2020 census, the county's population was 226,847.

The county was created from Island County by the Washington Territorial Legislature in March 1854. It originally included the territory of present-day San Juan and Skagit Counties, which were later independently organized after additional settlement. Its name derives from the Lummi word Xwotʼqom, also spelled [x̣ʷátqʷəm], perhaps meaning "noisy" or "noisy water" and referring to a waterfall. Whatcom County has a diversified economy with a significant agricultural base, including approximately 60% of the nation's annual production of raspberries.

History
The Whatcom County area has known human habitation for at least twelve millennia. At least three aboriginal tribes have been identified in the area: Lummi (San Juan Islands, between Point Whitehorn and Chuckanut Bay), Nooksack (between Lynden and Maple Falls) and Semiahmoo (the northern portion, near Blaine).

This area was part of the Oregon Country at the start of the nineteenth century, inhabited both by fur prospectors from Canada and Americans seeking land for agricultural and mineral-extraction opportunities. Unable to resolve which country should control this vast area, the Treaty of 1818 provided for joint control. In 1827 the Hudson's Bay Company established Fort Langley near present Lynden.

By 1843, the Provisional Government of Oregon had been established, although at first there were questions as to its authority and extent. During its existence, that provisional government formed the area north of the Columbia River first into the Washington Territory, and then (December 19, 1845) into two vast counties: Clark and Lewis. In 1852, a portion of Lewis County was partitioned off to form Thurston County, and in 1853 a portion of the new county was partitioned off to form Island County.

The Washington Territory was formed as a separate governing entity in 1853. In 1854, that legislature carved several counties out of the existing counties, including Whatcom County on March 9, 1854, with area taken from Island County. The original county boundary was reduced in 1873 by the formation of San Juan County, and again in 1883 by the formation of Skagit County.

In 1855 the settlers erected a blockhouse west of Whatcom Creek, to protect against forays from the aboriginal inhabitants who were attempting to defend their homelands. That year the Treaty of Point Elliott was signed, which assigned the Lummi and Semiahmoo peoples a greatly-restricted reserved area.

The short-lived Fraser Canyon Gold Rush (1857–58) caused a short-term increase in the county's population, which briefly swelled to over 10,000 before the bubble burst.

In 1857 the federal government began the field work necessary to establish the national border between the United States and Canada, which had been agreed on as the forty-ninth parallel in this area, and which would also mark the north line of Whatcom County. As the work moved east, several of the workers chose to remain in the area as settlers.

Border crossings
Whatcom County's northern border is the Canada–US border with the Canadian province of British Columbia. Adjoining the county on the north (from west to east) are the Metro Vancouver suburbs of Delta, Surrey, Langley, the central Fraser Valley city of Abbotsford and the rural Fraser Valley Regional District.

The border crossing points are (from west to east): 
 the Point Roberts Tyee Dr to Tsawwassen (a neighborhood in Delta, BC). 
 the Peace Arch Border Crossing, where Interstate 5 meets British Columbia Highway 99; 
 the Pacific Highway Border Crossing connecting State Route 543 with British Columbia Highway 15, between Blaine and Surrey.  
 the Lynden–Aldergrove Border Crossing where (SR 539 connects to British Columbia Highway 13; 
 the Sumas-Huntingdon Border Crossing at Sumas (SR 9 connecting to Abbotsford, BC).  
 An additional unmanned legal crossing connects British Columbia's Skagit Valley Provincial Park to North Cascades National Park in Washington State.

Several shopping malls and other services in Bellingham and elsewhere in the county are geared to cross-border shopping and recreation.

Geography

Western Whatcom County is part of the Fraser Lowland, the plain of the Fraser River, most of which is in the Lower Mainland of British Columbia. 
At some periods in the past, one of the Fraser River's distributaries entered Bellingham Bay near Bellingham via what is now the mouth of the Nooksack River.

The remainder of Whatcom County is in the Cascade Range, including Mount Baker.
In their foothills is Lake Whatcom, which is drained by Whatcom Creek into Bellingham Bay.

The lowest points are at sea level along the Salish Sea, an arm of the Pacific Ocean.

Geographic features

Bellingham Bay
Birch Bay
Cascade Mountains
Chuckanut Mountains
Mount Baker, highest point in Whatcom County
American Border Peak
Sumas Mountain
Mount Shuksan
Chilliwack River/Chilliwack Lake
Eliza Island
Lake Whatcom
Lummi Island
Lummi Bay
Nooksack River
North Lookout Mountain, known locally as Galbraith Mountain
Portage Island
Semiahmoo Bay
Semiahmoo Spit
Skagit River/Ross Lake
Sumas River

National protected areas
 Mount Baker National Recreation Area
 Mount Baker-Snoqualmie National Forest (part)
 North Cascades National Park (part)
 Ross Lake National Recreation Area (part)
 Pacific Northwest National Scenic Trail (part)

State protected areas
 Birch Bay State Park
 Lake Terrell Wildlife Refuge
 Larrabee State Park
 Lookout Mountain (DNR)
 Lummi Island (part) (DNR)
 Stewart Mountain (DNR)
 Lake Whatcom Watershed

Major highways
Interstate 5 connecting with Seattle, Portland, Sacramento, Los Angeles, San Diego and points south.
SR 20 connecting US 101 and Sidney, British Columbia with Newport, Washington via the North Cascades Highway. Farthest north highway thru the Cascade Mountains in USA. Note that this highway does not connect to most of Whatcom County – Instead, a person would have to travel south to Sedro-Woolley in Skagit County to connect to Highway 20.
Alaska Marine Highway connecting Alaska highways to the Interstate Highway System.

Adjacent counties
Metro Vancouver Regional District, British Columbia– north
Fraser Valley Regional District, British Columbia – northeast
Cowichan Valley Regional District, British Columbia – west
Capital Regional District, British Columbia – west
Okanogan County – east
San Juan County – southwest
Skagit County – south

Demographics

2000 census
As of the census of 2000, 166,814 people, 64,446 households, and 41,116 families resided in the county. The population density was 79 people per square mile (30/km2). The 73,893 housing units averaged 35 per square mile (13/km2). The racial makeup of the county was 88.41% White, 0.69% Black or African American, 2.82% Native American, 2.78% Asian, 0.14% Pacific Islander, 2.49% from other races, and 2.66% from two or more races. About 5.21% of the population was Hispanic or Latino of any race. Of people of European ancestry, 15.5% identified as German, 9.2% as English, 8.2% as Dutch, 7.9% as Irish, 7.0% as Norwegian, and 6.6% as United States or American ancestry.

Of the 64,446 households, 30.40% had children under the age of 18 living with them, 51.20% were married couples living together, 8.80% had a female householder with no husband present, and 36.20% were not families. About 25.60% of all households were made up of individuals, and 8.40% had someone living alone who was 65 years of age or older. The average household size was 2.51 and the average family size was 3.03.

In the county, the population was distributed as 24.10% under the age of 18, 14.20% from 18 to 24, 27.50% from 25 to 44, 22.50% from 45 to 64, and 11.60% who were 65 years of age or older. The median age was 34 years. For every 100 females, there were 97.10 males. For every 100 females age 18 and over, there were 95.00 males.

The median income for a household in the county was $40,005, and for a family was $49,325. Males had a median income of $37,589 versus $26,193 for females. The per capita income for the county was $20,025. About 7.80% of families and 14.20% of the population were below the poverty line, including 14.20% of those under age 18 and 8.30% of those age 65 or over.

2010 census
As of the 2010 census,  201,140 people, 80,370 households, and 48,862 families resided in the county. The 90,665 housing units averaged . The racial makeup of the county was 85.4% White, 3.5% Asian, 2.8% American Indian, 1.0% Black or African American, 0.2% Pacific Islander, 3.3% from other races, and 3.8% from two or more races. Those of Hispanic or Latino origin made up 7.8% of the population. In terms of ancestry, 20.8% were German, 12.8% were Irish, 12.6% were English, 8.0% were Dutch, 6.9% were Norwegian, and 4.4% were American.

Of the 80,370 households, 28.0% had children under the age of 18 living with them, 48.0% were married couples living together, 8.8% had a female householder with no husband present, 39.2% were not families, and 27.8% of all households were made up of individuals. The average household size was 2.43, and the average family size was 2.97. The median age was 36.6 years.

The median income for a household in the county was $49,031 and for a family was $64,586. Males had a median income of $47,109 versus $34,690 for females. The per capita income for the county was $25,407. About 7.8% of families and 15.0% of the population were below the poverty line, including 14.9% of those under age 18 and 7.1% of those age 65 or over.

Government
The Whatcom County government is a municipal corporation operating under a county charter approved in 1978; it acts as a county constitution. Whatcom County is one of seven Washington counties to use the home rule charter provision of state law. Local government is split between the county, incorporated cities and towns, and special-purpose districts. These local governments are established and operate according to state law, and operate independently from the county government.

County government
The charter establishes the structure of Whatcom County government. The Whatcom County Council holds legislative powers granted to counties. The council consists of seven members elected for a term of four years. Council members are elected at the general election in November of odd-numbered years. Three council members are elected one year before a presidential election; four council members are elected one year after a presidential election. One member is elected from each of the five districts; two members are elected at-large, which favors candidates who can command a majority of voters. The county council also serves as the county board of health.

The executive branch consists of six elected officials, a county executive, and five department heads. The county executive is similar to a mayor or governor. The assessor, auditor, prosecuting attorney, sheriff, and treasurer are elected independently from the county executive and council. These six officials serve four-year terms. The county council establishes various departments by ordinance. The county council or county executive appoint department heads. These departments include administrative services, health, medical examiner, planning and development services, parks and recreation, and public works.

The judicial branch consists of a district court and superior court. The district court is a court of limited jurisdiction which handles civil and criminal cases. Criminal cases are limited to adults charged with misdemeanor and/or gross misdemeanor offenses. State law specifies what cases are in the district court's jurisdiction. The district court operates a small claims court to resolve civil cases involving monetary damages not exceeding $5,000. No attorneys are permitted to appear in small claims court. Cases are heard using less formal procedures. The district court has two judges, a court commissioner, and a support staff.

The superior court is a court of general jurisdiction. Superior court hears civil cases exceeding $75,000 or requesting non-monetary remedies. Superior court hears all juvenile criminal cases and all adult felony cases. Superior court also hears appeals from district court and municipal courts. Superior court staff include three judges, three full-time court commissioners, two part-time court commissioners, and support staff. District and superior court judges are elected by the county voters for a term of four years. Court commissioners are appointed by elected judges; commissioners have powers and responsibilities equal to elected judges.

Politics
Whatcom County has been largely Democratic in presidential elections since 1988. Since 2004, the Democratic presidential candidates have received the majority of the county's vote. In the 2020 election, Joe Biden handily won the county with a super majority of the vote at over 60%.

Cities and towns
Incorporated cities and towns provide municipal services. Each city or town has an elected council and mayor.

Special purpose districts
Special-purpose districts include cemetery, fire, hospital, library, school, and water and sewer districts. Each special district is governed by officials elected by voters within that jurisdiction.

Fire districts
Eleven fire districts, two city fire departments, and a regional fire authority provide fire prevention, fire fighting, and emergency medical services. Each fire district is governed by an elected board of commissioners. Most districts have three commissioners. Fire districts receive most of their revenue from property taxes. All of the fire districts and the regional fire authority have volunteer or paid-call firefighters and emergency medical technicians (EMTs), as does the City of Lynden Fire Department.

The City of Bellingham is an all-career department. Some of the districts also have full-time firefighter/EMTs. All fire districts use 9-1-1 for emergency calls. Whatcom County has one 9-1-1 call center located in Bellingham. Fire/EMS calls are processed and dispatched at a second public safety answering point called Prospect, located at a fire station in Bellingham. Additional dispatching locations provide backup capacity to answer emergency calls.

Whatcom County Fire Districts are:
 Fire District 1 serves Deming, Everson, Nooksack, and Nugents Corner.
 Fire District 2 was amalgamated into South Whatcom Regional Fire Authority.
 Fire District 3 was merged to form Fire District 21.
 Fire District 4 contracts for service with Fire District 21.
 Fire District 5 serves Point Roberts.
 Fire District 6 was amalgamated into South Whatcom Regional Fire Authority.
 Fire District 7 serves areas near Ferndale and Cherry Point.
 Fire District 8 serves Bellingham International Airport, the Lummi Nation, and Marietta.
 Fire District 9 was amalgamated into South Whatcom Regional Fire Authority.
 Fire District 10 was amalgamated into South Whatcom Regional Fire Authority.
 Fire District 11 serves Lummi Island
 Fire District 13 was merged to form Fire District 21.
 Fire District 14 serves areas around SR 542 between Deming and Maple Falls, SR 547, and Sumas.
 Fire District 16 serves communities along SR 9 south of SR 542.
 Fire District 17 serves Sandy Point.
 Fire District 18 serves southern Lake Whatcom and Glenhaven Lakes.
 Fire District 19 serves Glacier.
 Fire District 21, North Whatcom Fire and Rescue serves northwest Whatcom County including Birch Bay, Blaine, Laurel, and Lynden°, Hayne, Delta, and Greenwood
 The South Whatcom Regional Fire Authority serves Geneva, Sudden Valley, Chuckanut Drive, Lake Samish, and Yew Street Road.

° Outside Lynden city limits only. The Lynden Fire Department serves Lynden.

Law enforcement 

The Whatcom County Sheriff's Office is responsible for maintaining the county jail, providing security at the Whatcom County Superior Court, serving civil processes, coordinating emergency management among the county's emergency services, and maintaining law and order in rural areas.

The first sheriff was Ellis "Yankee" Barnes who was sworn into office in 1854, during a period in which the border between the United States and British Columbia along Whatcom County had not been fully delineated. That year, Barnes seized and auctioned 34 rams that belonged to Canadian farmer Charles Griffin for Griffin's failure to pay United States taxes. The event was one of several provocations that led to the Pig War between the United States and the United Kingdom.

In 1863 James Kavanaugh served as sheriff. Kavanaugh, who married Princess Tol Sol of the Swinomish tribe, had previously served as the first United States Marshal in the Pacific Northwest.

In 2005 the sheriff's office reported 80 deputies and 53 corrections officers on-staff.

As of 2016, the sheriff is Bill Elfo.

Economy
Coal mines, a sawmill, and a military fort were established on Bellingham Bay in the 1850s. Logging was the principal economic activity at first, and agriculture developed as land was cleared by logging activity. Canneries, both of fish and crops, shipped the county's products far and wide.

Pacific American Fisheries organized in 1899 in Fairhaven, and became the world's largest canning operation, employing over 1,000 Chinese and 4,500 "white persons". Smaller canneries at Semiahmoo also produced 2,000 cases of canned salmon daily. The Fairhaven Shipyard constructed fleets of fishing ships, and also produced freighters during World War I.

Whatcom County is the top producer of raspberries in the state in the state of Washington, producing about 99% of the state's crop annually. This amount, varying from 60 to 80 million pounds per year, usually represents around 85% of the entire United States' raspberry harvest.

Cross border activity is a significant driver of the economy.

Education

Primary and secondary education
Whatcom County residents are served by public and private schools, providing preschool, primary (K-5), and secondary (6–12) education. Public schools are operated by eight school districts. Each school district is an independent local government managed by an elected school board. Seven districts serve the western portion of Whatcom County. One district serves the southeast corner of Whatcom County. The remaining portion of the county is national forest or national park land, which has no permanent residents.

These districts (including any with any portion in the county, even if the schools are not in the county) are:
 Bellingham School District serves Bellingham, Chuckanut, Lake Samish, and Sudden Valley.
 Blaine School District serves Blaine, Birch Bay, and Point Roberts.
 Concrete School District serves the county's southeast corner, including Newhalem and Diablo.
 Ferndale School District serves Ferndale, Custer, Lummi Island, and the Lummi Nation.
 Lynden School District serves Lynden and surrounding areas.
 Meridian School District serves rural communities between Bellingham and Lynden.
 Mount Baker School District serves communities along the Mount Baker Highway and Nooksack River.
 Nooksack Valley School District serves Everson, Nooksack, and Sumas.
 Sedro-Woolley School District

Numerous private schools operate in Whatcom County, including Assumption Catholic School, St. Paul's Academy, Lynden Christian Schools, Bellingham Christian Schools, and the Waldorf School.

Higher education
Whatcom County hosts five institutions of higher education. Western Washington University (Western) is the third-largest public university in Washington. Western offers bachelor's and master's degrees through seven colleges and enrolls more than 15,000 students. Whatcom Community College is a public community college offering academic certificate programs and associate degrees. Two universities and two colleges are located in Bellingham. One college is located on the Lummi Nation (Lummi Reservation) west of Bellingham. Bellingham Technical College is a public technical and vocational college located in Bellingham. Trinity Western University (TWU) is a private, Christian university based in Langley, BC, about 25 miles north of Bellingham. TWU operates a branch campus in Bellingham, offering undergraduate courses and supports TWU's bachelor's degree completion program.

Northwest Indian College is a college supported by the Lummi Nation and serves the Native American community. Northwest Indian College is located on the Lummi Nation (Lummi Reservation), about five miles west of Bellingham.

Communities

Cities
 Bellingham (county seat)
 Blaine
 Everson
 Ferndale
 Lynden
 Nooksack
 Sumas

Census-designated places

 Acme
 Birch Bay
 Custer
 Deming
 Geneva
 Glacier
 Kendall
 Maple Falls
 Marietta-Alderwood
 Peaceful Valley
 Point Roberts
 Sudden Valley

Unincorporated communities

 Blue Canyon
 Chuckanut
 Clearbrook
 Clipper
 Dewey
 Diablo
 Laurel
 Lummi Island
 Newhalem
 Saxon
 Semiahmoo
 Van Buren
 Wahl
 Welcome
 Wickersham

Ghost town
Barron
Chancellor
Gold Hill
Goshen
Park
Semiahmoo
Shuksan

Notable people

Steve Alvord, defensive tackle in the NFL in 1987–88.
Tim Soares (born 1997), basketball player for Ironi Ness Ziona of the Israeli Basketball Premier League
Ryan Stiles, Emmy Award-nominated actor and comedian
Hilary Swank, award-winning movie actress

See also
National Register of Historic Places listings in Whatcom County, Washington
Nooksack Salmon Enhancement Association, a non-profit organization dedicated to salmon restoration
Whatcom Watch, a local newspaper

References

External links

 
1854 establishments in Washington Territory
North Cascades of Washington (state)
Western Washington
Washington placenames of Native American origin